"Baby, You Make Me Crazy" is a song by English singer and songwriter Sam Smith. The song was released on 29 June 2018 through Capitol Records, as the fourth single from The Thrill of It All. It was written by Smith themselves, Jimmy Napes and Emile Haynie, and contains a sample of "Breeze and Soul" by Ed Watson & The Brass Circle, written by Dennis Ronald Thomas, Woodrow Sparrow, Gene Redd Sr., George Melvin Brown, Claydes Smith, Richard Westfield, Robert Bell, Robert Mickens and Ronald Bell.

Music video 
A music video, containing an acoustic version of the song, was released in June 2018. It features Smith with four backing vocalists and a guitarist performing in Italy.

Track listing

Charts

Release history

References

External links
 

2018 singles
2017 songs
Sam Smith (singer) songs
Songs written by Sam Smith (singer)
Songs written by Emile Haynie
Songs written by Claydes Charles Smith
Songs written by Robert "Kool" Bell
Songs written by Ronald Bell (musician)
Songs written by Jimmy Napes